Žďár nad Sázavou is a town in the Vysočina Region of the Czech Republic. It has about 20,000 inhabitants. The town is both industrial and tourist centre. It is known for the Pilgrimage Church of Saint John of Nepomuk, which is a UNESCO World Heritage Site.

Administrative parts
Town parts of Žďár nad Sázavou 1–8 and villages of Mělkovice, Radonín, Stržanov and Veselíčko are administrative parts of Žďár nad Sázavou.

Geography
It lies on the Sázava River.

The territory is rich on ponds. The largest body of water is Pilská Reservoir, which was built in 1959–1962 and today it serves as a recreational area, for fishing and as protection against floods.

Žďár nad Sázavou lies in a hilly landscape of the Křižanov Highlands and is one of the highest cities in the country with a population of over 10,000.

History

Žďár was founded as a settlement of nearby Cistercian monastery, which was established in 1252. The original settlement was soon moved on the left bank of the Sázava, in the site of today's historic centre. In 1293, Žďár was first referred to as a market town.

From 1588, Žďár came under administration of Olomouc Bishopric, but remained loyal to he Cistercian monastery, which resulted in a long-running dispute. In 1606, the monastery was abolished and the dispute settled down. In 1607, Žďár was promoted to a town. The monastery was rebuilt to a castle in 1614. In 1638, the monastery was restored, but was attacked by Swedish army during the Thirty Years' War. The town was ransacked in 1645. After it was destroyed by a great fire, the monastery was definitely abolished in 1784.

In the second half of the 19th century, Žďár developed both culturally and economically. In 1898 and 1905, the railway was constructed. First factories were established and part of the old town was rebuilt.

After the World War II, a large engineering and foundry company ŽĎAS was founded and the population significantly increased. New suburbs were created and in the 1970s the entire historic centre was rebuilt.

Demographics

Economy
The engineering and foundry company ŽĎAS was founded in 1951 and to this day is still one of the most important employers in the region. Other large industrial employers based in the town include a branch of the car parts producer Cooper-Standard Automotive, a branch of Hettich (a manufacturer of furniture fittings), and Tokoz, a Czech manufacturer of keys and fittings.

Transport
Žďár nad Sázavou is situated on a major rail link from Prague to Brno and Žilina.

Sights

Žďár nad Sázavou is best known for the Pilgrimage Church of Saint John of Nepomuk on the hill Zelená hora, a UNESCO World Heritage Site. It was designed by Jan Santini Aichel. It was built in the Baroque style in 1719–1722.

Žďár nad Sázavou Castle houses today serves cultural purposes and houses the New Generation Museum, an audiovisual museum presenting the history of the castle complex and other important buildings in the region. Part of the complex is the Basilica of Our Lady of the Assumption and St. Nicholas of the former monastery.

In the centre of the town there is the parish Church of Saint Procopius, which was first mentioned in 1391 and rebuilt in the late Gothic style in 1560. The church tower is open to the public. Next to the church is the Baroque Chapel of Saint Barbara from 1729.

The main sight of the town square is the Old Town Hall, a Renaissance building from the turn of the 16th and 17th centuries with Neoclassical façade from the 18th century.

Notable people
František Drdla (1868–1944), violinist and composer
Tomáš Rolinek (born 1980), ice hockey player
Petr Koukal (born 1982), ice hockey player
Eva Vítečková (born 1982), basketball player

Twin towns – sister cities

Žďár nad Sázavou is twinned with:
 Cairanne, France
 Flobecq, Belgium
 Khust, Ukraine
 Schmölln, Germany

References

External links

Populated places in Žďár nad Sázavou District
Cities and towns in the Czech Republic